Kampong Pandan may refer to:
 Kampong Pandan, Brunei
 Kampung Pandan, a village in Kuala Lumpur, Malaysia